Linda Newton may refer to:

Linda Newton (wrestling)
Linda Newton (actress), see My Two Wives